Radosav Stojanović (born 1 November 1950) is a Serbian writer, journalist and lexicographer.

Biography
He grew up in Mlačište in Crna Trava. Went to school in Mlačište, Crna Trava, Niš and Priština. He graduated from Priština University in Serbo-Croatian Language and Serbian literature.

He was a teacher at "Ivo Lola Ribar" Secondary School in Priština, a journalist, editor and editor-in-chief (1990–1993) for the "Jedinstvo" daily newspaper, and director of the Provincial National Theatre (1993–2004) in Priština

He was a full-time columnist and chronicler for "Književne reči" from Kosovo and Metohija (1985–1988), and president of the Literary Society of Kosovo and Metohija (1990–1992). He was editor of the "Stremljenja" magazine and editor-in-chief of "Srpski jug" (2004–2006) in Niš. He is member of the Writers' Association of Serbia since 1985 and the Journalists' Association of Serbia since 1979.

He is presented in anthologies and selections of Serbian poetry and short stories, both in the country and abroad. His works have been translated into other languages. He was exiled from Kosovo in June 1999.  He lives in Niš and Čemernik.

Works

Books of poetry

 Inoslovlje, Jedinstvo, Priština, 1979
 Rukopis čemerski (The Čemerski Manuscript), Jedinstvo, Priština, 1982 
 Đavolja škola (Devil's School), BIGZ, Beograd, 1988, 
 Povratak na kolac (Return to the Stake) Nolit, Beograd, 1990, 
 Sidro (Anchor), Rad, Beograd, 1993, 
 Netremice, Hvosno, Leposavić, 2003,  and 2004, 
 Trepet (Quiver), Vranjske – Društvo književnika Kosova i Metohije, Vranje – Kosovska Mitrovica, 2007, 
 Pesme poslednjeg zanosa (Poems of Final Rapture), selected and new poems, Panorama, Priština – Beograd, 2012, 
 Bequeathing / Zаveštаnje, selected and new poems about love, Serbian – English edition, translated by Dusica Vuckovic, Hybrid Publishers, Melbourne, Victoria, Australia, 2014, 
 Kad bi ljubavi bilo (If There Was Love), Majdan, Kostolac, 2015, 
 Pesme sudnjeg dana (Doomsday Songs) Čigoja štampa, Beograd, 2019.

Short story books
 Aritonova smrt (Ariton's Death), Prosveta – Jedinstvo, Beograd – Priština, 1984
 Apokrifne price (Apocryphal Stories), Jedinstvo, Priština, 1988, 
 Mrtva straža (Deathwatch), Književne novine, Beograd, 1988,  and Novi svet, Priština, 1997, 
 Kraj sveta (End of the World), Rad, Beograd, 1993, 
 Gospodar uspomena (Lord of Memories), Nolit, Beograd, 1996, 
 Živi zid (Human Wall), selection, SKZ, Beograd, 1996, 
 Molitva za dečansku ikonu (A Prayer for the Icon of Dečani), Prosveta, Niš, 1998, 
 Hristovi svedoci (Christ's Witnesses), Filip Višnjić, Beograd, 2001, 
 Crnotravske priče (Stories from Crna Trava), selection, Prosveta, Niš, 2002, 
 Vlasinska svadba (Vlasina Wedding), Narodna knjiga, Beograd, 2004, 
 Euridikini prosioci (Eurydice's Suitors), Panorama, Beograd – Priština, 2007, 
 Zapisano u snovima (Written in Dreams), stories about love, Panorama, Priština – Beograd, 2013, 
 Hvatanje straha (Catching Fear), Panorama, Priština – Beograd, 2015
 Priče sa krsta (Stories from the cross) Panorama-Jedinstvo, Priština - Kosovska Mitrovica, 2019

Novels
 Divlji kalem (Wild Graft), Narodna knjiga, Beograd, 2002, ; and Vranjske knjige, Vranje, 2010, 
 Angelus (Angelus), SKZ, Beograd, 2004, 
 Mesečeva lađa (Moon Vessel), Narodna knjiga, Beograd, 2005, 
 Tri hvata neba (Three seizes the sky), Niški kulturni centar, Niš, 2018.

Books for the child
 Kakvu tajnu kriju ptice (What secrets are hidden by birds), Panorama, Beograd-Kosovska Mitrovica, 2016, 
 Priče iz unutrašnjeg džepa (Stories from the inner pocket), Panorama-Jedinstvo, Priština-Kosovska Mitrovica, 2018,

Lexicography
 Crnotravski rečnik (Crna Trava Terminology), Srpski dijalektološki zbornik no. LVII, SANU – Institut za srpski jezik SANU, Beograd, 2010

Nonfictional prose
 Živeti s genocidom, hronika kosovskog beščašća 1980 – 1990 (Living with Genocide, a chronicle of the dishonor of Kosovo 1980 – 1990), Sfairos, Beograd, 1990, 
 Uprkos svemu, 70 godina Narodnog pozorišta u Prištini (Despite all, 70 years of the National Theater in Pristina), Narodno pozorište Priština, Gračanica - Priština, 2019.

Dramas
 Mrtva straža (Deathwatch), Novi svet, Priština, 1993, 
 Krivovo i druge drame (Krivovo and Other Dramas), Panorama, Beograd – Priština, 2003,

Dramas published other than in books
 Propast sveta na Veligdan (The End of the World on Easter Day), Teatron, 107, Beograd, 1999
 Sendvič, (Sandwich), Srpski jug, 5, 2006
 Sabor na Gorešnjak (Assembly on the day of Summer Archangel), Riječ/Riječ, godina IV, br. 3 – 4, Brčko, 2009, and Gradina, 37, 2010

Performed dramas
 Mrtva straža (Deathwatch), Provincial National Theatre, Priština, 1994, directed by Miomir Stamenković
 Propast sveta na Veligdan (The End of the World on Easter Day), "Bora Stanković" Theatre, Vranje1997, directed by Jug Radivojević
 Metohijska ikona (The Icon of Metohija), monodrama, National Theatre, Peć, 1997, directed and played by Miomir Radojković
 Krivovo (Krivovo), "Bora Stanković" Theatre, Vranje, 2003, directed by Jug Radivojević

Radio drama
 Poslednji pogled na Dragodan (A Final Look at Dragodan), directed and played by Stevan Đorđević, Radio Priština – Radio Toplica, Prokuplje, 2004

Journal editor
 Tri veka seoba Srba (Three Centuries of the Great Migration of the Serbs),1990
 Vidovdanski glasnik, 1993
 Srpski jug, 2004 – 2006

Awards
 Annual award "Jedinstvo" for journalism, 1981 and 1982
 Stevan Sremac Award for newspaper article, 1987, 1991 and 1992
 Lazar Vučković Award, for poetry1985 and short story1992
 Zlatno pero despota Stefana Lazarevića (Despot Stefan Lazarević Golden Pen), 1990
 Milutin Uskoković, second, 1993 and 2000
 Literary Society Award of Kosovo and Metohija for best book, 1999
 Laza K. Lazarević Award, 2001
 Rade Drainac Award, 2004
 Special Award of the "Joakim Vujić" Professional Theatre Festival of Serbia, 2000

References

Literature
 Julie Mertus: Kosovo: how myths and truths started a war, Univerzitety of California Press, Berkeley / Los Angeles / London, 1999, pp. 119 and 348
 Robert Elsie: Historical dictionary of Kosova, Scarecrow Press, 2004, Lanham, Maryland, pp. 113 and 174
 Cindi Tino-Sandoval: Yorba Linda, Columbia University Press, New York, 2005, pp. 530 – 531
 Narativna gramatika, književni svet Radosava Stojanovića u svetlu kritike, Niški kulturni centar – Filozofski fakultet u Nišu, Niš, 2016
 Enciklopedija srpskog naroda, Zavod za udžbenike, Beograd, 2008, p 1100
 Staniša Vojinović: Bibliografija Radosava Stojanovića, Vlasotinački zbornik, no. 3, Vlasotince, 2009, pp. 494 – 534,
 Slobodan Simonović: Enciklopedija Kruševca i okoline, Kruševac, 2011, pp. 430 – 431,
 Enciklopedija Niša, kultura, Centar za naučna istraživanja SANU i Univerziteta u Nišu, Niš, 2011, pp. 440–441
 Danilo Kocić, Leskovačački pisci i njihovo doba(I – II) Leskovac, 2016
 Ismet Markoviq: Stojanoviq (Stojanović) Radosav (1950), Fjalori enciklopedik i Kosoves, II L-ZH, Akademia e skencave dhe e arteve e Kosoves, Priština 2018, стр. 1535;

External links
 Open library, Radosav Stojanović
 Spisak Stojanovićevih knjiga
 Historical dictionary of Kosova 
  O romanu Mesečeva lađa i biografija
 SANU izdao "Crnotravski rečnik"
 Jezik je konzervator vekova, razgovor
 Ništa ne počinje danas, razgovor

1950 births
Serbian novelists
Serbian male poets
Serbian male short story writers
Serbian dramatists and playwrights
Serbian journalists
Yugoslav journalists
Writers from Kruševac
Living people

See also
 Danica Jevrić
 Lazar Vučković
Vukašin Filipović